Don Patterson (July 22, 1936 – February 10, 1988) was an American jazz organist.

Early life
Patterson played piano from childhood and was heavily influenced by Erroll Garner in his youth. In 1956, he switched to organ after hearing Jimmy Smith play the instrument.

Career 
In the early-1960s, he began playing regularly with Sonny Stitt, and he began releasing material as a leader on Prestige Records from 1964 (with Pat Martino and Billy James as sidemen). His most commercially successful album was 1964's Holiday Soul, which reached #85 on the Billboard 200 in 1967.

Personal life 
Patterson's troubles with drug addiction hobbled his career in the 1970s, during which he occasionally recorded for Muse Records and lived in Gary, Indiana. In the 1980s, he moved to Philadelphia and made a small comeback, but his health deteriorated over the course of the decade, and he died there in 1988.

Discography

As leader
 Goin' Down Home (Cadet, 1963 [rel. 1966]) -with Paul Weeden, Billy James
 The Exciting New Organ of Don Patterson (Prestige, 1964) -with Booker Ervin
 Hip Cake Walk (Prestige, 1964) -with Booker Ervin 
 Patterson's People (Prestige, 1964) -with Sonny Stitt, Booker Ervin
 Holiday Soul (Prestige, 1964) -with Pat Martino
 Satisfaction! (Prestige, 1965) -with Jerry Byrd
 The Boss Men (Prestige, 1965) -with Sonny Stitt, Billy James
 Soul Happening! (Prestige, 1966) -with Vinnie Corrao, Billy James
 Mellow Soul (Prestige, 1967) -with David "Fathead" Newman
 Four Dimensions (Prestige, 1967) -with Houston Person, Pat Martino, Billy James
 Boppin' & Burnin' (Prestige, 1968) -with Howard McGhee, Charles McPherson, Pat Martino
 Opus De Don (Prestige, 1968) -with Blue Mitchell, Junior Cook, Pat Martino, Billy James 
 Funk You! (Prestige, 1968) -with Sonny Stitt, Charles McPherson, Pat Martino, Billy James
 Oh Happy Day (Prestige, 1969) -with Virgil Jones, Houston Person, George Coleman, Pat Martino
 Brothers-4 (Prestige, 1969) -with Sonny Stitt, Grant Green, Billy James
 Donny Brook (Prestige, 1969) -with Sonny Stitt, Grant Green, Billy James
 Tune Up! (Prestige, 1964 and 1969 [rel. 1971])
 The Return of Don Patterson (Muse MR-5005, 1972 [rel. 1974]) -with Eddie Daniels [note: reissued on CD in 1991 as The Genius Of The B-3]
 These Are Soulful Days (Muse MR-5032, 1973 [rel. 1974]) -with Jimmy Heath, Pat Martino, Albert Heath [note: reissued on CD in 1998 as Steady Comin' At 'Ya]
 Movin' Up! (Muse MR-5121, 1977) -with Richie Cole, Vic Juris, Billy James
 Why Not... (Muse MR-5148, 1978) -with Virgil Jones, Bootsie Barnes, Eddie McFadden, Idris Muhammad

LP/CD compilations
 The Best Of Don Patterson (Prestige 7704, 1969)
 The Best Of Don Patterson & The Jazz Giants (Prestige 7772, 1969)
 Sonny Stitt/Booker Ervin/Don Patterson – Soul People (Prestige, 1993) (compilation of Soul People + 2 tracks from Tune Up!, and 1 track previously unissued from the Soul Happening! sessions) 
 Dem New York Dues (Prestige, 1995) (compilation of Opus De Don + Oh Happy Day)
 Legends Of Acid Jazz: Don Patterson/Booker Ervin (Prestige, 1996) (compilation of The Exciting New Organ Of Don Patterson + 1 track from Hip Cake Walk, and 1 track from Patterson's People)
 Legends Of Acid Jazz: Sonny Stitt/Don Patterson, Vol. 2 (Prestige, 1999) (compilation of Funk You! + Soul Electricity!)
 Legends Of Acid Jazz: Sonny Stitt (with Don Patterson) – Low Flame (Prestige, 1999) (compilation of Low Flame + Shangri-La)
 Legends Of Acid Jazz: Don Patterson/Booker Ervin/Houston Person – Just Friends (Prestige, 1999) (compilation of Four Dimensions, Hip Cake Walk [4 tracks], Patterson's People [2 tracks] + 1 track from Tune Up!)
 The Boss Men (Prestige, 2001) (compilation of Night Crawler, The Boss Men + 2 tracks from Patterson's People)
 Brothers 4 (Prestige, 2001) (compilation of Brothers-4, Donny Brook + 1 track from Tune Up!)

As sideman
With Eddie "Lockjaw" Davis
 I Only Have Eyes for You (Prestige, 1962)
 Trackin' (Prestige, 1962)

With Eric Kloss
 Introducing Eric Kloss (Prestige, 1965)
 Love and All That Jazz (Prestige, 1966)

With John Simon
 Legacy (Muse, 1986 [rel. 1996])

With Sonny Stitt
 Boss Tenors in Orbit! (Verve, 1962) -with Gene Ammons
 Feelin's... (Roost, 1962)
 Low Flame (Jazzland, 1962)
 Shangri-La (Prestige, 1964)
 Soul People (Prestige, 1964) 
 Night Crawler (Prestige, 1965)
 Deuces Wild (Atlantic, 1966)
 Parallel-a-Stitt: Sonny Stitt On The Varitone (Roulette, 1967)
 Made for Each Other (Delmark, 1968 [rel. 1972])
 Soul Electricity! (Prestige, 1968) -with Billy Butler
 It's Magic (Delmark, 1969 [rel. 2005])
 Just The Way It Was (Live At The Left Bank) (Label M, 1971 [rel. 2000])
 Black Vibrations (Prestige, 1971) -with Melvin Sparks

References

1936 births
1988 deaths
American jazz organists
American male organists
Cadet Records artists
Muse Records artists
Prestige Records artists
Transatlantic Records artists
20th-century American musicians
20th-century organists
Jazz musicians from Ohio
20th-century American male musicians
American male jazz musicians
20th-century American keyboardists